The Province of Caserta is a province in the Campania region of southern Italy. The Palace of Caserta is located near to the city, a former royal residence which was constructed for the Bourbon kings of Naples. It was the largest palace and one of the largest buildings erected in Europe during the 18th century. In 1997, the palace was designated a UNESCO World Heritage Site.

History

The province of Caserta in the historical Terra di Lavoro region, also known as Liburia, covered the greatest expanse of territory around the 13th century when it extended from the Tyrrhenian Sea and the islands of Ponza and Ventotene to the Apennines and the southern end of the Roveto Valley. In the Kingdom of Naples and the Kingdom of the Two Sicilies, Caserta was one of the most important departments in southern Italy.

The first capital of the region was the ancient city of Capua until 1818, then Caserta. In addition to Naples, the most important centers were Caserta, Capua, Nola, Gaeta, Sora, Aversa, Teano, and Isola Liri. In 1816, during the French occupation, Joseph Bonaparte reformed the territorial division of the kingdom of Naples, on the basis of the French model. A series of royal decrees completed the reforms, introducing local administrative units or communes like the French ones. The new Napoleonic reforms led to the establishment of the Province of Naples. In 1863, after the annexation of the Kingdom of Italy, the north-eastern comuni of Terra di Lavoro became part of the province of Campobasso, and Venafro and the surrounding areas were later transferred to the province of Isernia, established in the 1870s. In 1927, Benito Mussolini decided to dissolve the province of Terra di Lavoro, uniting much of its territory and the Pontine Islands to the province of Naples, although municipalities near Piedimonte and Alife were distributed between the provinces of Benevento and Campobasso and the districts of Sora and Gaeta went to the province of Rome. In 1945, a Decree signed by Umberto di Savoia reconstituted the Province of Caserta, and finally in 1970, the modern province came into being.

Geography
The territory of the Province of Caserta, which lies on the southwestern part of central Italy, is bordered to the north by the  Matese mountains belonging to the Apennines and by undulating hills, and to the south and west by plains of various types. To the northeast, near the Matese mountains is the Lago del Matese. The karst massif is rich in water and minerals, and contains many caves and mountain lakes. Other mountainous areas of note include Monte Santa Croce, with the extinct volcano of Roccamonfina, on the border with Lazio, the Trebulani Mountains, in the central part of the province to the north including Monte Maggiore reaching , and the Tifatini Mountains to the south. The Volturno River flows through the centre of the province with a defensive outpost at Capua. The southern highlands of Caserta border the Province of Benevento.

Comunes

There are 104 comuni (singular: comune) in the province:

 Ailano
 Alife
 Alvignano
 Arienzo
 Aversa
 Baia e Latina
 Bellona
 Caianello
 Caiazzo
 Calvi Risorta
 Camigliano
 Cancello e Arnone
 Capodrise
 Capriati a Volturno
 Capua
 Carinaro
 Carinola
 Casagiove
 Casal di Principe
 Casaluce
 Casapesenna
 Casapulla
 Caserta
 Castel Campagnano
 Castel Morrone
 Castel Volturno
 Castel di Sasso
 Castello del Matese
 Cellole
 Cervino
 Cesa
 Ciorlano
 Conca della Campania
 Curti
 Dragoni
 Falciano del Massico
 Fontegreca
 Formicola
 Francolise
 Frignano
 Gallo Matese
 Galluccio
 Giano Vetusto
 Gioia Sannitica
 Grazzanise
 Gricignano di Aversa
 Letino
 Liberi
 Lusciano
 Macerata Campania
 Maddaloni
 Marcianise
 Marzano Appio
 Mignano Monte Lungo
 Mondragone
 Orta di Atella
 Parete
 Pastorano
 Piana di Monte Verna
 Piedimonte Matese
 Pietramelara
 Pietravairano
 Pignataro Maggiore
 Pontelatone
 Portico di Caserta
 Prata Sannita
 Pratella
 Presenzano
 Raviscanina
 Recale
 Riardo
 Rocca d'Evandro
 Roccamonfina
 Roccaromana
 Rocchetta e Croce
 Ruviano
 San Cipriano d'Aversa
 San Felice a Cancello
 San Gregorio Matese
 San Marcellino
 San Marco Evangelista
 San Nicola la Strada
 San Pietro Infine
 San Potito Sannitico
 San Prisco
 San Tammaro
 Sant'Angelo d'Alife
 Sant'Arpino
 Santa Maria Capua Vetere
 Santa Maria a Vico
 Santa Maria la Fossa
 Sessa Aurunca
 Sparanise
 Succivo
 Teano
 Teverola
 Tora e Piccilli
 Trentola-Ducenta
 Vairano Patenora
 Valle Agricola
 Valle di Maddaloni
 Villa Literno
 Villa di Briano
 Vitulazio

References

External links

 Official website 

 
Caserta
Caserta